The 2007–08 season of the Venezuelan Primera División, the top category of Venezuelan football, was played by 18 teams. The national champions were Deportivo Táchira.

Torneo Apertura

Torneo Clausura

Final Playoff

External links
Venezuela 2007-08 season at RSSSF

Venezuelan Primera División seasons
Ven
Ven
2007–08 in Venezuelan football